The 1908 Vermont Green and Gold football team was an American football team that represented  the University of Vermont as an independent during the 1908 college football season. In their only year under head coach Edward Herr, the team compiled a 3–3–3 record.

Schedule

References

Vermont
Vermont Catamounts football seasons
Vermont Green and Gold football